Dr. No's Ethiopium is the fourth album by hip hop rapper and producer Oh No.

Background
This solely instrumental album was released by Disruption Productions in 2009, and is described as an "album inspired-by and sampled-from rare 60s and 70s Ethiopian funk, jazz, folk, soul and psychedelic rock." The track "The Funk" was used in a Mountain Dew commercial. According to an article in the Los Angeles Times, that TV placement "beat CD sales 10 to 1 in terms of profit."

Track listing
"Pardon Me"
"Madness"
"The Funk"
"Concentrate"
"Xcalibur"
"Pussy"
"Adventure"
"Soul Of Ethiopia"
"Dare Say"
"World Traveler"
"Scary"
"Carnival"
"Louder"
"Electronic Monsters"
"Problematic"
"Fuego Tribe"
"Midnight Missions"
"Melody Mix"
"Drive By"
"Juke Joint"
"Loopadors"
"Laxatives"
"Raw Block"
"Sneaky"
"A Hundred"
"Ox Therapy"
"Butta"
"All My"
"Fresh Bacon"
"Crazzzzy"
"Funeral Parlor"
"Strong"
"Questions"
"The Pain"
"Great Oracle"
"Whoo Doo"

All tracks written by Oh No.

References

External links
 
 Oh No on Stones Throw
 Oh No on MySpace
 Stones Throw Records

Oh No (musician) albums
Stones Throw Records albums
Instrumental hip hop albums
2009 albums
Albums produced by Oh No (musician)